The 43rd FIE Fencing World Cup began in October 2013 and concluded in July 2014 at the 2014 World Fencing Championships held in Kazan. The World Cup medals were awarded during the FIE's gala dinner in Rome at Palazzo Colonna on 22 November 2014.

Season overview

Several high-profile fencers returned to competition after post-London 2012 breaks, including Romania's Simona Gherman, Italia's Mara Navarria and Russia's Sofiya Velikaya.

The season saw the domination of Italy in women's foil. In individual foil, Arianna Errigo win her fourth World Cup series in women's foil, the third time in a row. Three other Italians, Elisa Di Francisca, Martina Batini and Valentina Vezzali, follow her in the individual rankings. The four of them form the so-called “Dream Team”, which won every World Cup tournament of the season, the continental and the world championships.   Olha Kharlan maintained her domination over women's sabre, winning the continental championship, the World Championships and the World Cup for the second time in a row. In épée veteran Emese Szász won her second series after her 2009–10 crown.

The men's events were dominated by Asian countries. Korea's Gu Bon-gil was the first non-European to win the men's sabre series, pipping to the post his fellow countryman Kim Jung-hwan by only six points. Russia maintained however a tenuous lead in men's team sabre. In foil China's Ma Jianfei broke Andrea Cassarà's string of victories. In épée 19-year-old Park Sang-young, who ranked third, proved the revelation of the season. 2013–14 saw France's return to form, with veteran Ulrich Robeiri winning the men's épée series, young Enzo Lefort placing second in foil, and France taking the lead in team men's épée and foil.

The season was also marked by Ukraine's boycott of the men's and women's Moscow World Cup in protest at the death of a Ukrainian soldier in the Simferopol incident.

Individual épée

Top 10

Men's épée

Women's épée

Individual foil

Top 10

Men's foil

Women's foil

Individual sabre

Top 10

Men's sabre

Women's sabre

Team épée

Top 10

Men's team épée

Women's team épée

Team foil

Top 10

Men's team foil

Women's team foil

Team sabre

Top 10

Men's team sabre

Women's team sabre

References 

2013-14 
World Cup,2013-14
World Cup,2013-14
World Cup,2013-14
2013 in Russian sport
2014 in Russian sport